The Wei Chuan Dragons are a professional baseball team in Taiwan's Chinese Professional Baseball League (CPBL) that originally existed between 1990 and 1999. In 2019, negotiations regarding the franchise's revival and return to the CPBL took place. The team played one season of minor league baseball in 2020 and rejoined the CPBL in 2021.

History 

Wei Chuan Dragons had a long amateur history when its parent company, the Wei Chuan Foods Corporation, started sponsoring Chinese Culture University's baseball team in the late 1970s. After these student players graduated, Wei-Chuan formed an amateur team to allow them to continue playing baseball in 1978; it was this team that later professionalized to become one of the first four teams of the Chinese Professional Baseball League (CPBL). Due to the club's long history in the amateur era, its matches often attracted large crowds, and games with the Brother Elephants, another popular team, were often sold out. The team played at the now-demolished Taipei Municipal Baseball Stadium.

The club won CPBL championships four times, in 1990, 1997, 1998, and 1999, and became the team with most CPBL championships after the 1999 season ended. After the 1999 season, Wei Chuan Food Corporation announced its decision to disband the club, mainly due to threats from local criminal gangs (Wei Chuan Dragons's then manager Hsu Sheng-ming was attacked in April 1999), the financial loss brought about by CPBL's game-fixing scandals since 1996, and the Ting Hsin International Group becoming the largest (40%) shareholder of Wei Chuan Food Corporation in 1998, as the new Ting Hsin management did not show high interest in supporting the baseball club.

The disbandment shocked many local fans and a procession was even raised against the decision. However, the Wei Chuan Food Corporation did not change its mind. Most Wei Chuan Dragons' coaches and players later found their new homes at Sinon Bulls or Kaohsiung-Pingtung Fala. The CPBL also did not fine those former Wei Chuan players and coaches who returned with Macoto Gida and First Financial Holdings Agan before the 2003 season started, because they did not leave the CPBL voluntarily.

Records 

Regular seasons

Playoffs

Roster

See also 
 The Black Eagles Incident

Notes
 First half-season champions
 Second half-season champions

References

External links
Wei Chuan Dragons official website 

 
Chinese Professional Baseball League teams
Baseball teams established in 1989
1989 establishments in Taiwan
1999 disestablishments in Taiwan
Baseball teams disestablished in 1999
2019 establishments in Taiwan
Baseball teams established in 2019